Karl Groß (30 January 1884 – 14 July 1941) was a German wrestler. He competed in the light heavyweight event at the 1912 Summer Olympics.

References

External links
 

1884 births
1941 deaths
Olympic wrestlers of Germany
Wrestlers at the 1912 Summer Olympics
German male sport wrestlers
Sportspeople from Mannheim